

159001–159100 

|-id=011
| 159011 Radomyshl ||  || Radomyshl, Ukraine || 
|-id=013
| 159013 Kyleturner ||  || In memory of Kyle Walter Turner, of Missouri City, TX || 
|}

159101–159200 

|-id=102
| 159102 Sarahflanigan ||  || Sarah H. Flanigan (born 1985) is a supervising engineer at the Johns Hopkins University Applied Physics Laboratory, who served as the Deputy Guidance and Control Lead for the New Horizons Mission to Pluto. || 
|-id=164
| 159164 La Cañada ||  || Observatorio de La Cañada (La Cañada Observatory), Ávila, Spain, the discovery site || 
|-id=181
| 159181 Berdychiv ||  || Berdychiv, second most populous city in the Zhytomyr region in the northwest of Ukraine. || 
|}

159201–159300 

|-id=215
| 159215 Apan ||  || APAN, an amateur astronomical association from Novara, Italy, that oversees the Suno Observatory, where this minor planet was discovered || 
|}

159301–159400 

|-id=351
| 159351 Leonpascal ||  || Leon Pascal Kocher, grandchild of the discoverer || 
|}

159401–159500 

|-id=409
| 159409 Ratte || 1999 OJ || Étienne-Hyacinthe de Ratte (1722–1805), French astronomer and mathematician from Montpellier || 
|}

159501–159600 

|-bgcolor=#f2f2f2
| colspan=4 align=center | 
|}

159601–159700 

|-id=629
| 159629 Brunszvik ||  || Countess Teréz Brunszvik, the founder of the first nursery school in Hungary || 
|}

159701–159800 

|-id=743
| 159743 Kluk ||  || Kluk, a Czech hill near the Kleť mountain, location of the Kleť Observatory where this minor planet was discovered || 
|-id=776
| 159776 Eduardoröhl ||  || Eduardo Röhl (1891–1959), Venezuelan scientist, humanist and entrepreneur who initiated the creation of the Llano del Hato National Astronomical Observatory in 1952. || 
|-id=778
| 159778 Bobshelton ||  || Robert Shelton (born 1948), nineteenth president of the University of Arizona, chaired the Keck Telescope Board from 1997 to 2000, important contributor to the success of the SOAR Telescope in Chile and the Southern African Large Telescope (SALT) facility in South Africa || 
|-id=799
| 159799 Kralice ||  || The Czech village of Kralice nad Oslavou. It is known for the printing house of the Unity of the Brethren (1578–1620). || 
|}

159801–159900 

|-id=814
| 159814 Saguaro ||  || The Saguaro National Park located in a desert landscape to the east and west of Tucson protects the majestic giant saguaro (Carnegiea gigantea) as well as other cacti. The giant saguaro is the supreme symbol of the American Southwest. || 
|-id=826
| 159826 Knapp ||  || Gillian R. Knapp (born 1944), Anglo-American astronomer and a Founding Mother of the Sloan Digital Sky Survey || 
|-id=827
| 159827 Keithmullen ||  || Keith Mullen (born 1952), American vice president of the Huachuca Astronomy Club of Sierra Vista, Arizona (see ) || 
|-id=865
| 159865 Silvialonso ||  || Silvia Alonso Perez (born 1976), teacher of astrometry to many Spanish amateur astronomers || 
|}

159901–160000 

|-id=902
| 159902 Gladstone ||  || George Randall Gladstone (born 1956), a Program Director for Research and Development at the Southwest Research Institute, who worked as a Co-Investigator and Atmospheres Team Lead for the New Horizons mission to Pluto. || 
|-id=974
| 159974 Badacsony ||  || Badacsony, a region in western Hungary, located north of Lake Balaton || 
|-id=999
| 159999 Michaelgriffin ||  || Michael D. Griffin (born 1949) served as the Johns Hopkins University Applied Physics Laboratory Space Department Head and previously served as the NASA Administrator during the New Horizons Mission to Pluto. || 
|}

References 

159001-160000